Tijo is a town in central Ethiopia. It is one of three settlements in Digeluna Tijo woreda.

History
The grave of a contemporary of Imam Ahmad Gragn named Ashab 'Utman, whom tradition says was an important missionary of Islam in what became the Arsi Zone, lies near Tijo. He is said to have been killed by the Ogaden warrior Atalibo and was then cursed for this deed by Imam Ahmad's successor Emir Nur ibn Mujahid. The Hadiya clans Dooda, Weege, and Malge claim him as their ancestor. Ashab 'Utman's cupola-shaped tomb, which Braukämper states "was presumably erected in the 1880s", over the following decades became an important focus of local Muslim attention.

Tijo served as the administrative center for Arsiland during the Italian occupation.

Records at the Nordic Africa Institute website provide details of a primary school in Tijo during the year 1968. Tijo is composed of several small villages which include Bura Jallee, Wajiifi Titte, Digeluu, Naannawa, and Kallaa.

Demographics 
Based on figures from the Central Statistical Agency of Ethiopia published in 2005, Tijo has an estimated total population of 2,048, of whom 946 are men and 1,102 women. The 1994 national census reported this town had a total population of 1,148 of whom 513 were men and 635 were women.

Notes

Cities and towns in Oromia Region